The following lists events that happened during 1868 in Australia.

Incumbents

Governors
Governors of the Australian colonies:
Governor of New South Wales – Somerset Lowry-Corry, 4th Earl Belmore
Governor of Queensland – Sir George Bowen, then Colonel Sir Samuel Blackall
Governor of South Australia – Sir Dominick Daly until 19 February
Governor of Tasmania – Colonel Thomas Browne, then Charles Du Cane
Governor of Victoria – Sir John Manners-Sutton
Governor of Western Australia – Dr John Hampton, then Sir Benjamin Pine

Premiers
Premiers of the Australian colonies:
Premier of New South Wales – James Martin, until 27 October then John Robertson
Premier of Queensland – Robert Mackenzie, until 25 November then Charles Lilley
Premier of South Australia – Henry Ayers, until 24 September then John Hart (2nd time), until 13 October then Henry Ayers (4th time), until 3 November then Henry Strangways
Premier of Tasmania – Richard Dry
Premier of Victoria – James McCulloch, until 6 May then Charles Sladen, until 11 July then James McCulloch (2nd time)

Events
 10 January – The last convict ship to Western Australia, the Hougoumont, arrives in Western Australia. This brought the end of penal transportation to Australia.
 5 March – The Queensland Parliament passes the Polynesian Labourers Act to regulate the employment of Pacific Islanders recruited through blackbirding.
 12 March – Henry James O'Farrell fires a revolver into the back of Prince Alfred, Duke of Edinburgh (second son of Queen Victoria) while the latter is picnicking in the beachfront suburb of Clontarf. It was Australia's first attempted political assassination. O'Farrell first claimed that he was acting under instruction from Melbourne Fenians but later retracted the claims. He had problems with alcoholism and mental illness.

Economy

The Geelong Woollen Company sets up the first woollen mill in Australia.

Sport
 May to October – The first Australian cricket team to tour overseas plays against several English teams, winning 14 matches, losing 14 and drawing 19.
 3 November – Glencoe wins the Melbourne Cup

Births

 21 February – Ernest Roberts, South Australian politician (born in the United Kingdom) (d. 1913)
 19 June – Richard Crouch, Victorian politician (d. 1949)
 27 October – William Gillies, 21st Premier of Queensland (d. 1928)
 14 November – Steele Rudd, author (d. 1935)

Deaths

 21 April – Henry James O'Farrell, attempted assassin (born in Ireland) (b. 1833)
 10 June – Charles Harpur, poet (b. 1813)
 21 July – William Bland, New South Wales politician and medical practitioner (born in the United Kingdom) (b. 1789)

References

 
Australia
Years of the 19th century in Australia